Enrico Borla is an Italian writer, psychiatrist and psychotherapist, co-founder and editor of the magazine "Radure" Notebooks of psychic material, published in Italy by Moretti&Vitali.

Enrico Borla is the author of several publications and essays.

Selected works
(with Ennio Foppiani), Losfeld, la terra del dio che danza, Bergamo: Moretti & Vitali, 2005 
(with Ennio Foppiani), Bricolage per un naufragio, Alla deriva nella notte del mondo, Bergamo: Moretti & Vitali, 2009

See also
 Ennio Foppiani
 Carl Gustav Jung
 Alfred Adler

References

1959 births
Living people
Psychodynamics
Psychology writers
Writers from Turin